Wootware.co.za  is an online retailer of computer hardware and software geared towards enthusiast computing. It is based in Somerset West in the Western Cape, South Africa.

The company currently offers delivery only within South African borders via door-to-door courier services such as Dawn Wing (a division of DPD Laser), FastWay and FedEx.

History
Wootware was founded in 2007 by Rory David Magee and operated from a residential address in Somerset West. Expansion required that the business relocate to the Somerset West Business Park in 2013, which currently serves as the headquarters of operation.

Name 
The term Woot originated as a hacker-term for root (or administrative) access to a computer. However, the term coincides with the gamer term w00t which is a portmanteau of the words 'Wow, loot!'

Distribution & Brand Offering 
Among others, brand offering includes tier-one OEMs / vendors such as ASUS, EVGA, Gigabyte, MSI, Intel and AMD CPU ranges as well as NVIDIA and AMD Radeon video cards.

See also
E-commerce
Online shopping

References

External links
Wootware.co.za
Facebook Account
Google+ Account
Twitter Account
Instagram Account

Online retailers of South Africa
Retail companies established in 2007
Companies based in Cape Town